The 2022 Biathlon Junior World Championships was held from 23 February to 2 March 2022 in Soldier Hollow, United States.

The Russian Federation was not allowed to participate in the event due to its invasion of Ukraine.

Schedule
All times are local (UTC–7).

Results

Junior events

Junior Men

Junior Women

Youth events

Youth Men

Youth Women

Medal table

References

Biathlon Junior World Championships
Biathlon competitions in the United States
2022 in youth sport
Junior World
2022 in American sports
International sports competitions hosted by the United States
2022 in sports in Utah
February 2022 sports events in the United States
March 2022 sports events in the United States